"English Summer Rain" is the fourth single from Placebo's fourth studio album Sleeping with Ghosts, released in 2004.

In the UK, it peaked at number 23 in the UK Singles Chart. In Australia, the song was ranked number 53 on Triple J's Hottest 100 of 2004.

CMJ New Music Report said of the song that it "encapsulates seduction in its steady, determined melody".

Track listings

CD

Enhanced CD

CD

7" vinyl

References

Placebo (band) songs
2004 singles
Songs written by Brian Molko
Songs written by Stefan Olsdal
Song recordings produced by Jim Abbiss
2003 songs
Virgin Records singles
Songs written by Steve Hewitt
Songs written by William Patrick Lloyd